La Porciúncula is a neighbourhood (barrio) in the locality of Chapinero in Bogotá, Colombia.

Limits 
North - calle 76
East - carrera 7
West - carrera 20
South - calle 72

References 

Neighbourhoods of Bogotá